Mike H. Pandey is an Indian film maker, specializing in films about wildlife and the environment. He has won over 300 awards for his work to spread awareness about biodiversity and species conservation, including helping conserve and protect key species such as whale sharks, elephants, tigers, vultures and horseshoe crabs.

Biography
Born in Kenya, the Nairobi National Park, which was at the back of the Pandey household proved a rich source of inspiration for both Mike and his brother Ishwar. Mike's adventures with the camera started when he was barely seven when his uncle presented him a Kodak Browning Box camera on his birthday. He still owns this heirloom. Trained and educated in the UK and US the brothers experiences have been wide and varied from training in Hollywood, USA as interns, to Director of special effects and war scenes in films like Razia Sultan, Betaab, Gazab etc. in India. However, Mike's passion and care for the natural world pulled him back to Indian wildlife. In 1973, Mike set up Riverbank Studios, a film studio in New Delhi, which focused on creating films about conservation and the wildlife.

In 1994, he became the first Asian producer / director to win the Wildscreen Panda Award, also known as the Green Oscar, for his film The Last Migration - Wild Elephant Capture in Surguja. In 2000, his film Shores of Silence: Whale Sharks in India, won the Green Oscar for the second time. The film also led to the ban on the killing of whale sharks on Indian shores. This film has also won a National Award for Best Film in the "Exploration & Adventure" Category, 2005. In October 2004, he did India proud once again by winning the Green Oscar for the Third time for his film Vanishing Giants – a story of his passion and involvement with elephants. This film also led to the ban of cruel and outdated techniques of elephant capture in India. The CMS – UNEP Award for Outstanding Achievement In Global Conservation, the Prithvi Ratan or was also awarded to Mike at the CMS Vatavaran Film Festival in November 2003, for his outstanding contribution towards generating awareness, which led to the conservation of a global heritage - the Whale Shark. Mike was also presented with the Award for Cinematic Excellence by Western India's Cinematographers Association in Mumbai, 2005.

Mike has also produced some of India's most popular television programmes like Earth Matters – a series on the wildlife and environment of India that has won four international awards and Khullam Khulla – a fun learning educational series for children. With over three decades of filmmaking experience, Mike has produced over 600 films and won scores of awards both national and International. His powerful films are living proof of the difference a film can make in bringing about changes locally, nationally and globally.

He was born in Nairobi to Indian-origin parents and was a Kenyan citizen by birth. He had a chance meeting in Nairobi in the 1970s with future PM Rajiv Gandhi, who encouraged him to immigrate to his ancestral land of India, reportedly telling Pandey: "We need a man of your talents in India."  Gandhi helped arrange assignments from Doordarshan for Pandey, although Pandey soon received other commissions as well. He subsequently made numerous award-winning films for Doordarshan and also became an Indian citizen. He was honoured with the V Shantaram Award at the Mumbai International film Festival in Mumbai in 2012 

Mike is now working on his latest film - The Return of the Tiger, which is supported by Hindi film Industry actors, Amitabh Bachchan and John Abraham.

References

External links
 
 Earth Matters website
 Official YouTube Channel

Indian conservationists
Indian filmmakers
Living people
Year of birth missing (living people)